Max Kobelt (born 5 January 1941) is a Swiss wrestler. He competed in the men's Greco-Roman middleweight at the 1964 Summer Olympics.

References

1941 births
Living people
Swiss male sport wrestlers
Olympic wrestlers of Switzerland
Wrestlers at the 1964 Summer Olympics
Place of birth missing (living people)